Two-point tensors, or double vectors, are tensor-like quantities which transform as Euclidean vectors with respect to each of their indices. They are used in continuum mechanics to transform between reference ("material") and present ("configuration") coordinates. Examples include the deformation gradient and the first Piola–Kirchhoff stress tensor.

As with many applications of tensors, Einstein summation notation is frequently used. To clarify this notation, capital indices are often used to indicate reference coordinates and lowercase for present coordinates. Thus, a two-point tensor will have one capital and one lower-case index; for example, AjM.

Continuum mechanics
A conventional tensor can be viewed as a transformation of vectors in one coordinate system to other vectors in the same coordinate system. In contrast, a two-point tensor transforms vectors from one coordinate system to another. That is, a conventional tensor,
 ,
actively transforms a vector u to a vector v such that 

where v and u are measured in the same space and their coordinates representation is with respect to the same basis (denoted by the "e").

In contrast, a two-point tensor, G will be written as
 
and will transform a vector, U, in E system to a vector, v, in the e system  as    
.

The transformation law for two-point tensor
Suppose we have two coordinate systems one primed and another unprimed and a vectors' components transform between them as 
.
For tensors suppose we then have
.
A tensor  in the system . In another system, let the same tensor be given by
 .
We can say
.
Then 

is the routine tensor transformation. But a two-point tensor between these systems is just
 
which transforms as
 .

Simple example
The most mundane example of a two-point tensor is the transformation tensor, the Q in the above discussion. Note that
 .
Now, writing out in full,

and also
.
This then requires Q to be of the form
 .
By definition of tensor product,

So we can write
 
Thus
 
Incorporating, we have
.

See also
 Mixed tensor
 Covariance and contravariance of vectors

References

External links
 Mathematical foundations of elasticity By Jerrold E. Marsden, Thomas J. R. Hughes
 Two-point Tensors at iMechanica

Tensors
Euclidean geometry